The Ciudad Deportiva del Real Zaragoza is the training ground and academy base of the Spanish football club Real Zaragoza. It was opened in 1974 by the efforts of then-club president Jose Angel Zalba. It was designed by architect Julio Descartín.

Located in Cuarte de Huerva 8 km south of Zaragoza and covering an area of 150,000 m², it is used for youth and senior teams trainings.

Currently, the coordinator of the Ciudad Deportiva is Pedro Suñén.

Facilities
 Ciudad Deportiva Stadium with a capacity of 2,500 seats, is the home stadium of Deportivo Aragón, the reserve team of Real Zaragoza.
 2 grass pitches.
 1 artificial pitch.
 2 mini grass pitches.
 3 outdoor swimming pools.
 4 outdoor tennis courts.
 2 indoor sport halls.
 1 outdoor basketball court.
 Service centre with gymnasium and a small grass pitch.

References

Real Zaragoza
Real Zaragoza
Sports venues completed in 1974